The Hampstead Bypass, likely planned to be designated as U.S. Route 17 Bypass (US 17 Byp.), is a planned route in the U.S. state of North Carolina, serving as a bypass of Ogden and Hampstead. It will consist of two sections which meet at NC 140: a limited-access extension of Military Cutoff Road and a controlled-access portion that will serve as a bypass of Hampstead. The Military Cutoff Road extension began construction in 2017 and is expected to open to traffic in early 2023, while the first section of the Hampstead Bypass is scheduled for construction in 2022.

Route description
Currently under construction, the first section of the Hampstead Bypass will begin at an interchange between US 17 (Military Cutoff Road/Market Street) and US 17 Business (Market Street) near Ogden. It will continue northwest as a six-lane at-grade expressway with a  speed limit through a wooded area, passing over Ogden Park Drive near Ogden Park. The route will then come to a large residential development in Murraysville, turning northeast and meeting three streets at signalized superstreet intersections. Moving into another wooded area, the route will intersect a connector to Plantation Road, becoming a freeway immediately after. Military Cutoff Road will then end at an interchange with NC 140.

It will continue from the end of the Military Cutoff Road extension onto the Hampstead Bypass, a four-lane freeway running through a wooded rural area. Shortly after, the freeway will come to another interchange with Hoover Road. Northeast of Hampstead, it will turn east toward US 17, ending at an interchange with that road.

History
Both the Military Cutoff Road extension and the Hampstead Bypass were first studied by the North Carolina Department of Transportation (NCDOT) in the 1990s as separate projects. A feasibility study was drafted in 1999 for the Hampstead Bypass, but the final study was never published. In 2004, the study was reinstated and the study for the Military Cutoff Road extension was published as well. The two projects were merged into a single major project because they end at the same point and function as a single road. The record of decision was completed in September 2014 after the final environmental impact statement was published the previous July.

Construction on the extension of Military Cutoff Road began in late 2017 starting with the interchanges at Market Street and NC 140.

Signing plans released in November 2017 indicated that the Military Cutoff Road extension would temporarily receive a state route designation which had not yet been determined. Local officials in March of that year had requested the US 17 Bypass designation for the entire corridor once complete, with US 17 to remain on its existing route. This was opposed by NCDOT on the grounds that the entire length of the road does not serve as a bypass of the greater Wilmington area, instead ending in the city. Additionally, this would result in three routes numbered 17 meeting at the same location—US 17, US 17 Business, and US 17 Bypass—which could cause driver confusion. Rerouting US 17 onto the new road was considered, but local feedback from a public meeting in May 2018 showed that it would be costly and confusing for residents and businesses on US 17 to change their addresses.

Traffic shifts will take place at the southern terminus of the Military Cutoff Road extension, with traffic on the existing Military Cutoff Road (US 17) temporarily diverted onto the future ramps around Prospect Cemetery to allow construction of the bridge over Market Street (US 17/US 17 Business). The extension to NC 140 is expected to open to traffic in spring of 2023.

The Hampstead Bypass portion of the project is divided into two parts. The first to begin will be the section of the road between NC 210 and US 17 north of Hampstead and includes upgrading  of US 17 in Hampstead to feature superstreet intersections. The second will complete the bypass between NC 140 and NC 210, completing the project overall. Though initial plans called for the US 17 upgrades to begin in 2021 and for the bypass to begin in 2025, funding was accelerated to allow both the US 17 upgrades and the northern section of the bypass to begin in 2020. It was then pushed to a start date of 2022 with overall completion of the project expected in 2030.

Military Cutoff extension major intersections

Hampstead Bypass major intersections 

US 17 North = Northern terminus

References

External links

NCDOT: U.S. 17 Hampstead Bypass and Military Cutoff Road Extension

State highways in North Carolina
Transportation in New Hanover County, North Carolina
Transportation in Pender County, North Carolina
Freeways in North Carolina
Proposed state highways in the United States